The following highways are numbered 626:

United States